Alton "Big Al" Carson (October 2, 1953 – April 26, 2020) was an American blues and jazz singer from New Orleans. He performed with his band, the Blues Masters, in New Orleans, and with other bands.

In addition to singing, he played tuba (or more specifically Sousaphone), including with such New Orleans brass bands as the Eagle Brass Band, the Spirit of New Orleans Brass Band   and the Young Tuxedo Brass Band.  Carson performed and recorded with multiple jazz and brass bands in New Orleans, including under the leadership of Doc Paulin, Lars Edegran, and Dr. Michael White.

In 1994, he traveled to Europe on a New Orleans music tour, where he performed for the Dutch royal family. The tour included Aaron Neville and Ernie K-Doe. He died on April 26, 2020 at the age of 66 after a heart attack.

References

External links
 Official website at Internet Archive
 

1953 births
2020 deaths
20th-century African-American male singers
American blues singers
Singers from Louisiana
American jazz singers
Musicians from New Orleans